Andrea Massa (1607–1654) was a Roman Catholic prelate who served as Bishop of Gallipoli (1651–1654)
and Bishop of Castellammare di Stabia (1645–1654).

Biography
Andrea Massa was born in Melfi, Italy on 6 Jun 1607.
On 18 Sep 1645, he was appointed during the papacy of Pope Innocent X as Bishop of Castellammare di Stabia.
On 8 Oct 1645, he was consecrated bishop by Giovanni Giacomo Panciroli, Cardinal-Priest of Santo Stefano al Monte Celio, with Alfonso Gonzaga, Titular Archbishop of Rhodus and Ranuccio Scotti Douglas, Bishop of Borgo San Donnino, serving as co-consecrators. 
On 25 Sep 1651, he was appointed during the papacy of Pope Innocent X as Bishop of Gallipoli.
He served as Bishop of Gallipoli until his death on 30 Dec 1654.

References

External links and additional sources
 (for Chronology of Bishops) 
 (for Chronology of Bishops) 
 (for Chronology of Bishops) 
 (for Chronology of Bishops) 

17th-century Italian Roman Catholic bishops
Bishops appointed by Pope Innocent X
1607 births
1654 deaths